Omega Tau Sigma is a Veterinary Medicine professional fraternity started at the University of Pennsylvania School of Veterinary Medicine in 1906.

History 
Omega Tau Sigma was founded by several students in Veterinary Medicine at the University of Pennsylvania in Philadelphia in 1906. Within its first decade the fraternity spread to several other Colleges of Veterinary Medicine when it went international with a chapter at Ontario Veterinary by 1914.  Omega Tau Sigma is the only Veterinary Medical fraternity to have an international reach. It eventually spread to fifteen veterinary schools in the United States along with the branch in Canada.

The first meeting of its international governing body, the Grand Chapter, was held on 1 April 1911 in Philadelphia. Today, the Grand Chapter meets annually in October.

Chapters 
The fraternity has had chapters at 16 Colleges of Veterinary Medicine.  Active chapters are in bold, inactive chapters in italics. Chapters include:

Epsilon chapter proposed, and constitution drawn up, but GWU dropped the Veterinary School prior to chartering.

See also 

 Professional fraternities and sororities

References 

Student organizations established in 1906
Student societies in the United States
Professional fraternities and sororities in the United States
Veterinary medicine-related professional associations
Former members of Professional Fraternity Association
1906 establishments in Pennsylvania
Veterinary medicine in the United States